The Red Cloak (Italian: Il mantello rosso) is a 1955 French-Italian historical adventure film directed by Giuseppe Maria Scotese and starring Patricia Medina, Fausto Tozzi and Jean Murat.

Cast

 Patricia Medina as Laura Lanfranchi 
 Fausto Tozzi as Luca de Bardi 
 Jean Murat as Cosimo, il capitano del popolo 
 Bruce Cabot as Capitano Raniero d'Anversa 
 Colette Deréal
 Guy Mairesse as il Guercio 
 Lyla Rocco as Stella 
 Domenico Modugno as Saro 
 Nyta Dover
 Jean-François Calvé
 Aldo Pensa
 Erminio Spalla
 Franco Caruso
 Eduardo de Santis as Capitano dei Guelfi 
 Jeanne Fusier-Gir
 Giorgio Gandos
 Giacomo Rossi Stuart
 Franco Fantasia
 Andrea Fantasia
 Giulio Battiferri
 Carlo Marrazzini
 Edoardo Davila

References

Bibliography
 Kinnard, Roy & Crnkovich, Tony . Italian Sword and Sandal Films, 1908–1990. McFarland, 2017.

External links
 

1955 films
1950s historical adventure films
1950s Italian-language films
English-language Italian films
English-language French films
Italian historical adventure films
French historical adventure films
Films by Giuseppe Maria Scotese
1950s Italian films
1950s French films